ESEO or eseo may refer to:

European Student Earth Orbiter in the Student Space Exploration & Technology Initiative
École supérieure d'électronique de l'Ouest, a French Grande École